The City of Portland was a named passenger train on the Union Pacific Railroad  between Chicago, Illinois, and Portland, Oregon.  The first trip left Portland on June 6, 1935, using the streamlined M-10001 trainset.  With only one set of equipment, the train left each terminal six times a month.  A broken axle derailed the trip that left Chicago on July 23, 1935, and the repaired train resumed service with the trip leaving Portland on February 6, 1936. In May 1936 it started running five times a month instead of six, allowing more time in Chicago between trips. (In July 1935 it was scheduled to arrive Chicago at 9:30 AM and leave at 6:15 PM the same day.)

It was the first streamliner with sleeping cars and the first streamliner running from Chicago to the Pacific coast; its 39-hour-45-minute schedule became the standard. (In April 1935 the fastest train took 59 hr 20 min Chicago to Portland.) The M-10001 was withdrawn in March 1938 and replaced with another articulated trainset, the former City of Los Angeles M-10002. In July 1941 M-10002 was replaced with a train powered by the EMC E3 set inherited from City of Los Angeles pulling the former M-10004 cars, with some former M-10001 cars added.  Service was expanded following the war as the train was joined, then replaced, by full-size trains powered by E6 and E7 locomotives.  The train was the first of the 40-hour Coast streamliners to run daily, in February 1947. Starting in October 1955 the Milwaukee Road was used instead of the Chicago and North Western between Chicago and Omaha; from January 1959 until 1967 the train ran via Denver. The train was discontinued May 1, 1971, with the takeover of Union Pacific's passenger services by Amtrak. The route roughly follows the trail of the defunct Amtrak route, the Pioneer, except that the latter diverted to Ogden, Utah, while the City of Portland did not enter Utah.

In addition to baggage, coach, and sleeping cars, about 1955 the City of Portland added an Astra Dome dome coach, dome observation lounge and dome dining car to each consist.  The dome dining cars were unique to Union Pacific and were only operated on this train and the City of Los Angeles.

Major cities served
Prior to 1955:
Chicago, Union Station
Cedar Rapids, Union Station
Omaha, Union Station
Boise, Union Pacific Depot
Portland, Union Station

Following 1955 rerouting via Milwaukee Road:
Chicago, Union Station
Marion station (Cedar Rapids via bus connection)
Omaha, Union Station
Boise, Union Pacific Depot
Portland, Union Station

Following 1959 rerouting:
Chicago, Union Station
Marion station (Cedar Rapids via bus connection)
Omaha, Union Station
Denver, Union Station
Boise, Union Pacific Depot
Portland, Union Station

See also
 Passenger train service on the Chicago and North Western Railway
 Passenger train service on the Union Pacific Railroad

References

External links

 Passenger trains operating on the eve of Amtrak

Passenger trains of the Union Pacific Railroad
Passenger trains of the Chicago and North Western Railway
Passenger trains of the Milwaukee Road
Named passenger trains of the United States
Railway services introduced in 1935
Night trains of the United States
Railway services discontinued in 1971